Vladimir Sheshenin (born 10 March 1989) is a Russian racing driver currently competing in the TCR International Series. Having previously competed in the Russian Circuit Racing Series, LADA Granta Cup & LADA Revolution Cup amongst others.

Racing career
Sheshenin began his career in 2001 in Karting, he raced there for many seasons up until 2008. In 2006 he switched to the LADA Revolution Cup, he raced there for a single season and finished 4th in the championship standings at the end of the season. Having returned to karting in 2007, he stayed there until 2008. He switched to the Russian Touring Light Championship for 2010, finishing 4th in the championship standings. In 2011 he switched to the LADA Kalina Cup, finishing 3rd in the standings. In 2012 he raced in both the LADA Granta Cup and Russian National Championship, he won the Russian National Championship and finished 3rd in the LADA Granta Cup that year. For 2013 he switched to the Russian Circuit Racing Series, he finished 3rd in the standings that year. In 2014 he won the championship taking 4 wins, he finished 2nd in championship standings in 2015. In 2016 he takes his third championship title in Russian National Championship.

In July 2016 it was announced that he would race in the TCR International Series, driving a Volkswagen Golf GTI TCR for Liqui Moly Team Engstler.

Racing record

Complete TCR International Series results
(key) (Races in bold indicate pole position) (Races in italics indicate fastest lap)

References

External links
 
 

1989 births
Living people
TCR International Series drivers
Russian racing drivers
Russian Circuit Racing Series drivers
Sportspeople from Yekaterinburg
Engstler Motorsport drivers